Mazzini is an Italian surname. Notable people with the surname include:
 Gianluca Mazzini, Italian engineer
 Giuseppe Mazzini, Italy's independence/unification activist
 Miha Mazzini, Slovenian writer, scriptwriter and film director
 Mina Mazzini, Italian pop singer
 Marco Antonio Mazzini, Peruvian clarinetist 

Italian-language surnames